Speranza pallipennata is a species of moth in the family Geometridae first described by William Barnes and James Halliday McDunnough in . It is found in North America.

The MONA or Hodges number for Speranza pallipennata is 6317.

References

Further reading

 

Macariini
Articles created by Qbugbot
Moths described in 1912